The solitary eagle or montane solitary eagle (Buteogallus solitarius) is a large Neotropical eagle. It is also known as the black solitary eagle.

Range and habitat 
The solitary eagle is native to Mexico and Central and South America.  It is found in mountainous or hilly forests, at elevations between 600 m and 2,200 m.  The frequent reports from lowlands are usually misidentifications of another species, usually the common black hawk or great black hawk; no reports from lowlands have been confirmed.  It is rare that in all areas of its range and poorly known. Very little is known about its diet, other than that it appears to have often been predating large snakes and one adult pair was seen hunting deer fawns. The remains of a chachalaca were noted in one nest.

Description 
The adult solitary eagle is uniformly dark gray, often appearing black, with white markings on the tail. It appears very similar to the common black hawk and great black hawk, but is much larger and has significantly broader wings, extending nearly to the tip of the tail. The exceptionally broad wings are one of the prime distinguishing characteristics of this species. Its body also has quite a thickset appearance.

The juvenile is mottled brown and tan, with markings around the eyes.  It otherwise resembles the adult.

Relationships 
Recent DNA studies have shown that the solitary eagle is closely related to the black-hawks.

References

 Howell, Steve N.G., and Sophie Webb. "A Guide to the Birds of Mexico and Northern Central America." Oxford University Press, New York, 1995.
 Jones, H. Lee. Birds of Belize. University of Texas Press, Austin, Texas, 2003.
"Raptors of the World" by Ferguson-Lees, Christie, Franklin, Mead & Burton. Houghton Mifflin (2001), .

Further reading
 Novy, S.A. and R.D. Van Putte.  2016.  Behavioral Notes and Nesting of the Black Solitary Eagle (Buteogallus solitarius) in Belize. Transactions of the Illinois State Academy of Science, Vol. 109, pp. 29–33.

solitary eagle
Birds of Mexico
Birds of Central America
Birds of the Northern Andes
solitary eagle
solitary eagle